Evans, Anderson, Phelan & Co was an Australian engineering and railway rolling stock manufacturer, located at Kangaroo Point, Queensland. It manufactured steam locomotives for the Queensland Railways until 1927. The works were not located near a railway, so completed locomotives were delivered along Main Street on temporary track.

In 1892 The North Queensland Register described the company as one of the oldest established iron works in this colony... noted for excellent designs and high class work...(which) manufacture everything incidental to mining and milling work.

Products

25 A12 class locomotives
21 B15 class locomotives
70 PB15 class locomotives
41 C16 class locomotives
28 C17 class locomotives

 Pissoirs

References

Kangaroo Point, Queensland
Defunct locomotive manufacturers of Australia
Engineering companies of Australia